A Wedding is a 1978 American satirical comedy-drama film directed by Robert Altman, with an ensemble cast that includes Desi Arnaz, Jr., Carol Burnett, Paul Dooley, Vittorio Gassman, Mia Farrow, Lillian Gish, Geraldine Chaplin, Howard Duff, Nina Van Pallandt, Amy Stryker, and Pat McCormick. The story is told in typical Altman style, with multiple plots and overlapping humorous dialogue.

The story takes place in a single day during a lavish wedding that merges a nouveau riche Southern family with an established wealthy Chicago family having possible ties to organized crime.

Plot
Dino Corelli marries Muffin Brenner and attends the reception at the Corelli mansion. Bedridden matriarch Nettie Sloan, mother of Dino's mother Regina Sloan Corelli, is being tended by disreputable Dr. Jules Meecham. While speaking with wedding planner Rita Billingsley, Nettie suddenly dies. Meecham informs Dino's father, Luigi Corelli, but Luigi is unable to tell his wife Regina because she is mentally unstable. Nettie's corpse remains in bed throughout the reception, while various attendees visit her room without realizing she's dead. By the time bossy daughter Toni finds out and plans a dramatic announcement, other family members are mostly unsurprised or not even too upset.

The Brenners are a nouveau riche family from Louisville, Kentucky, where Muffin's father, "Snooks", made millions in the trucking industry. The Corellis are an old money family from North Shore Chicago. Because of rumors that Luigi has mob connections, virtually every invitee sent regrets. Only one guest (other than family members) attends. Nevertheless, Rita is determined to run the reception by the book, setting up a receiving line for the one guest and asking family members and staff to go down the line so it will not look empty.

A series of disasters unfolds, including the display of an embarrassing nude portrait of the bride; caterer Ingrid Hellstrom becoming ill, then getting high and causing a disturbance after Meecham gives her a pill; and a tornado when the cake is to be cut, forcing everyone to find shelter in the cellar. Two guests arrive late: the groom and bride's disgruntled exes, Tracy Farrell and Wilson Briggs, who bond over their shared anger.

Unsavory family drama unfolds. Regina is a drug addict. Her marriage was arranged by Nettie after Luigi met Regina while working as a waiter in Italy. Luigi was forced to change his name and be estranged from his Italian family for 22 years. His Italian-speaking brother unexpectedly shows up, and when Meecham reminds Luigi that Nettie is dead and can no longer impose the marriage conditions, Luigi is thrilled to see his long-lost brother. Regina's sister Clarice has a romance with her African-American butler, Randolph; her other sister, Toni, is married to Mack Goddard, who falls in love at first sight with Tulip Brenner, mother of the bride, and tries to woo her.

Snooks has a borderline incestuous attachment to his nearly mute daughter Buffy, the maid of honor, who speaks at the reception only once, to tell Dino she is pregnant and he is the father. Not wanting to be upstaged by the bride, Buffy disrobes in front of Muffin's nude portrait. Dino confides to Wilson about Buffy's pregnancy; Wilson tells Tracy, who vindictively spreads the news. Snooks confronts Dino, who admits to sleeping with Buffy but says she also slept with nearly every member of his military-school barracks. Snooks's sister from New Jersey, Marge Spar, starts romancing the Corellis' gardener, while bridesmaid Rosie Bean is unaware her shy friend Shelby Munker is having an affair with Rosie's husband Russell.

Muffin and Dino prepare to leave for their honeymoon in a new car, the Corellis' wedding gift. Muffin is rattled when Rita makes an unexpected pass at her. She then finds Dino in the shower with his groomsman, Reedley Roots, seemingly engaged in a gay sexual encounter. Actually, Dino has passed out drunk and Reedly is just holding him up straight while trying to sober him up.  The newlyweds' car is seen driving away, and the families assume Dino and Muffin left without saying goodbye. Snooks drives his family back to their hotel. They see Dino's car wrecked and in flames, and rush back to the mansion to share the awful news. The families are grieving when Muffin and Dino appear from upstairs, having never left because of Dino's passing out. When Luigi remembers that the car keys were last seen in Wilson's possession, it becomes clear that Wilson (presumably accompanied by Tracy, since she is nowhere to be found), out for revenge, stole the car and died in the crash. Tulip privately declares the incident was God punishing her for sinful thoughts of having an affair with Mack.

Luigi pays his respects to Nettie. He tells her corpse he kept his bargain for 22 years, and no one there knows who he really is. Now he will take his leave. He finds his brother in the bushes, making love with Buffy. Luigi and his brother happily drive away as a half-dressed Buffy waves goodbye.

Cast

 Carol Burnett as Katherine "Tulip" Brenner         
 Paul Dooley as Liam "Snooks" Brenner               
 Amy Stryker as Muffin Brenner                          
 Mia Farrow as Elizabeth "Buffy" Brenner            
 Dennis Christopher as Hughie Brenner              
 Gerald Busby as Rev. David Ruteledge                    
 Peggy Ann Garner as Candice Ruteledge   
 Mark Deming as Matthew Ruteledge            
 Lesley Rogers as Rosie Bean                    
 Tim Thomerson as Russell Bean  
 Marta Heflin as Shelby Munker
 Mary Seibel as Aunt Marge Spar
 Margaret Ladd as Ruby Spar                    
 Lillian Gish as Nettie Sloan                       
 Nina Van Pallandt as Regina Sloan Corelli          
 Vittorio Gassman as Luigi Corelli                  
 Desi Arnaz Jr. as Dino Sloan Corelli               
 Belita Moreno as Daphne Corelli                    
 Luigi (Gigi) Proietti as Dino Corelli I (brother of Luigi)
 Virginia Vestoff as Clarice Sloan

 Dina Merrill as Antoinette "Toni" Sloan Goddard           
 Pat McCormick as Mackenzie "Mack" Goddard
 Ruth Nelson as Aunt Beatrice Sloan Cory
 Ann Ryerson as Victoria Cory
 Cedric Scott as Randolph
 Craig Richard Nelson as Capt. Reedley Roots
 Jeff Perry as Bunky LeMay
 Howard Duff as Dr. Jules Meecham
 Beverly Ross as Nurse Janet Schulman
 Geraldine Chaplin as Rita Billingsley
 Viveca Lindfors as Ingrid Hellstrom
 John Cromwell as Bishop Martin
 Lauren Hutton as Florence Farmer
 Allan F. Nicholls as Jake Jacobs
 John Considine as Jeff Kuykendall
 Dennis Franz as Koons
 Pam Dawber as Tracy Farrell
 Gavan O'Herlihy as Wilson Briggs
 Robert Fortier as Jim Habor
 Bert Remsen as William Williamson

Several actors who later had notable film or television careers appeared as extras, including John Malkovich, Gary Sinise, Laurie Metcalf, Dennis Franz, Alan Wilder, and George Wendt.

Production
The film was inspired by a remark Altman made while doing publicity for 3 Women. Upon being asked what his next movie would be, Altman jokingly replied that he was going to shoot a wedding next. Later, Altman and his production assistant decided to follow through on the idea and began planning the film.

The film was shot almost exclusively over an 8-week period at the Lester Armor House in Lake Bluff, Illinois.

The role of Bishop Martin was the final film appearance by longtime actor and director John Cromwell, who died on September 26, 1979, at age 91. Cromwell's wife of 33 years, Ruth Nelson, appeared as Aunt Beatrice Sloan Cory.

A Wedding was the 100th film in which Lillian Gish appeared.

Reception
Roger Ebert gave A Wedding three-and-a-half out of four stars, writing "It begins in comedy, it moves into realms of social observation, it descends into personal revelations that are sometimes tragic, sometimes comic, and then it ends in a way that turns everything back upon itself. The more you think about what Altman's done, the more impressive his accomplishment becomes". Gene Siskel gave it one-and-a-half stars out of four, writing "Altman mistreats us to one boob after another. He appears not to care for any one of the people involved here. He creates pompous straw men and women and then he ridicules them. It's a particularly mean-spirited movie likely to please no one". Variety wrote "Altman's loose, seemingly unstructured style backfires in this comedy drama. Even the innovative director-producer's legion of fans will be disappointed. Those already not a member of his cult will find this work tedious". Charles Champlin of the Los Angeles Times wrote "Altman in A Wedding, for all his undifferentiated sport with the upper reaches of the middle class, remains the entertaining satirist rather more than the angry scold. Still we have all come a long way from Father of the Bride, and A Wedding is an original and funny piece of work". Jack Kroll of Newsweek called it "one of Altman's best films, at once one of his funniest and one of his darkest visions of a crazy, contradictory America". Gary Arnold of The Washington Post wrote "Musically and pictorially, Altman can't hide his condescension. He has invented a wedding party, ostensibly a misalliance between old but tarnished Midwestern aristocracy and new, uncouth Southern wealth, but that seems to inspire him to nothing but stale jokes and complacent contempt". Pauline Kael of The New Yorker wrote "There's no way to get into the movie; it's like a busted bag of marbles—people are running every way at once".

On Rotten Tomatoes, the film has an approval rating of 73%, based on 11 reviews, with an average rating of 6.6/10.

Awards and nominations

Burnett won the Best Actress Award at the San Sebastian International Film Festival, Spain's equivalent of France's Cannes Film Festival.

Burnett won the People's Choice Award for Favorite All-Around Female Entertainer Film and Television.

Burnett was nominated for a Golden Globe Award for Best Supporting Actress in a Motion Picture.

Opera

A Wedding is a 2004 comic opera based on Altman's film, composed by William Bolcom, with a libretto written by Robert Altman and Arnold Weinstein.

See also
 List of American films of 1978

References

Sources

External links
 
 
 Roger Ebert's review

1978 films
1978 comedy-drama films
1970s English-language films
1970s satirical films
20th Century Fox films
American comedy-drama films
American satirical films
Films about dysfunctional families
Films about social class
Films about weddings in the United States
Films adapted into operas
Films directed by Robert Altman
Films set in country houses
Films set in Illinois
Films shot in Illinois
Films with screenplays by Patricia Resnick
1970s American films